Live from the Golden Age of Riders Radio Theater is a compilation album by the Western band Riders in the Sky in 2006. The album is a collection of songs featured on the Riders' weekly radio show: Riders Radio Theater. It is available as a single CD.

Track listing 
 "Back in the Saddle Again"
 "Wah-Hoo"
 "Along the Navajo Trail"
 "Bye Bye Blackbird"
 "A Cowboy Has to Sing"
 "The Wayward Wind"
 "Singin' a Song of The Sage"
 "I Still Do"
 "That's How the Yodel Was Born"
 "Empty Saddles in the Old Corral"
 "Lonely Yukon Stars"
 "Riding the Old Front Range"
 "Beyond the Reef"
 "Wild Fiddler's Rag"
 "Little Joe, The Wrangler"
 "Chant of the Plains"
 "Chime Bells"
 "The Last Waltz"
 "Song of the Bandit"
 "This Ain't the Same Old Range"

Personnel
Douglas B. Green (a.k.a. Ranger Doug) – vocals, guitar
Paul Chrisman (a.k.a. Woody Paul) – vocals, fiddle
Fred LaBour (a.k.a. Too Slim) – vocals, bass
Joey Miskulin (a.k.a. Joey The Cowpolka King) – vocals, accordion

External links
Riders in the Sky Official Website
Nashville Symphony album listing

2006 live albums
Riders in the Sky (band) live albums